The Craeybeckx tunnel (in Dutch Craeybeckxtunnel and fully Lode Craeybeckxtunnel) is a road tunnel in Antwerp built in 1981 to reduce the noise from the traffic, for the benefit of the Sint-Augustinus hospital and the Middelheim hospital.
The tunnel is 1600 m long and is the widest in Belgium. The construction is named after Lode Craeybeckx, the mayor of Antwerp between 1947 and 1976.
Approximately 120.000 vehicles pass the tunnel every day.

References

Road tunnels in Belgium
Buildings and structures in Antwerp
Roads in Antwerp